The Rochester Free Academy is a former secondary school and historic building (1872–1873) in Rochester, New York.  It is part of the City Hall Historic District.

History
The Free Academy was founded by the Board of Education in 1853 and opened in 1857. Initially called   "the High School," it was incorporated as the Rochester Free Academy in 1862.  In 1871, the adjacent lot was purchased, and the surviving brick structure replaced the original school building.

Notable alumni
Isaac Adler
Lucy Elmina Anthony
Edward Joseph Hanna

References

National Register of Historic Places in Rochester, New York